Geedweyne is a town in the southwestern Gedo region of Somalia.

References

Geedweyne: Somalia on Geographical Names

Populated places in Gedo